Diplosolenodes occidentalis is a species of air-breathing land slug, a terrestrial pulmonate gastropod mollusk in the family Veronicellidae, the leatherleaf slugs.

Distribution
Diplosolenodes occidentalis was originally discovered and described by Lansdown Guilding from the West Indian island of Saint Vincent. It seems likely that this species is native to most of the Lesser Antilles.

The distribution of Diplosolenodes occidentalis includes the Lesser Antilles:
 Dominica – first record in 1884, then in 1892

It has been introduced to the Greater Antilles, Central America and northern South America:
 Nicaragua
 Costa Rica
 In El Hatillo Miranda state – Venezuela

It occurs in greenhouses in Logan County, Oklahoma.

This species has not yet become established in the wild in the US, but it is considered to represent a potentially serious threat as a pest, an invasive species which could negatively affect agriculture, natural ecosystems, human health or commerce. Therefore, it has been suggested that this species be given top national quarantine significance in the USA.

Description
This slug is most easily recognized by the black speckling on its mantle or hyponota. The body length can reach up to 60 mm.

Ecology
This species may be found in undisturbed environments as well as in agricultural settings, where it may be regarded as a minor pest.

References
This article incorporates CC-BY-3.0 text from the reference.

Further reading
 Baker H. B. (1925). "North American Veronicellidae". Proceedings of the Academy of Natural Sciences of Philadelphia 77: 157–184, Pl. 3–6. JSTOR
 Coto A. T. D. (1983). "Combate de la babosa Diplosolenodes occidentale (Guilding) (Soleolifera: Veronicellidae) con extractos de plantas". Tesis, Universidad de Costa Rica, San Jose. 53 pp.
 Thomé J. W. (1989). "Annotated and illustrated preliminary list of the Veronicellidae (Mollusca[ Gastropoda) of The Antilles, and Central and North America". J. Med. & Appl. Malacol. 1: 11–28.
 Thomé J. W. (1993). "Estado atual da sistemática dos veronicellidae (Mollusca; Gastropoda) americanos, con comentários sobre sua importáncia económica, ambiental e na saúde". Biociéncias, Porto Alegre 1(1): 61–75.
 Thomé J. W., dos Santos P. H. & Pedott L. (1997). "Annotated list of Veronicellidae from the collections of the Academy of Natural Sciences of Philadelphia and the National Museum of Natural History, Smithsonian Institution, Washington D.C., U.S.A. (Mollusca: Gastropoda: Soleolifera)". Proceedings of the Biological Society of Washington 110: 520–536, figs 1–16. page 522.
 Julieta Fernandez de V. (1982). "Contribucion al Conocimiento de las Babosas y Sietecueros (Mollusca: Gastropoda) Que Causan Daños a la Agricultura en Venezuela". Rev. Fac. Agron. (Maracay), XII(3–4). 353–386. http://avepagro.org.ve/fagro/v12_34/v124m010.html – listed as Latipes pterocaulis in Venezuela.

Veronicellidae
Gastropods described in 1825